Mikko Markkula (born 3 January 1981) is a Finnish rally co-driver.

Rally career
Mikko Markkula began his rally career in 2001, co-driving for several drivers in the World Rally Championship.

From 2007 to 2011, he was the co-driver of Juho Hänninen.

In 2013, Markkula started to co-drive for Andreas Mikkelsen in a third Volkswagen Polo R WRC. The crew achieved their first WRC podium in the 2014 Rally Sweden. However, they ended their partnership three rounds later after Argentina, where they finished fourth overall.

Starting from 2015, Markkula firmed a partnership with Teemu Suninen. In 2017, the crew was signed by M-Sport World Rally Team. In the 2018 Rally de Portugal, Markkula gained his second podium finish. He left as Suninen's co-driver at the end of 2018. He was replaced by Marko Salminen.

Career results

WRC results

References

External links

 Mikko Markkula's e-wrc profile

1981 births
Living people
Finnish rally co-drivers
World Rally Championship co-drivers
21st-century Finnish people